Karezan District is a district (bakhsh) in Sirvan County, Ilam Province, Iran. At the 2006 census, its population was 8,272, in 1,693 families.  The District has no city.  The District has two rural districts (dehestan): Karezan Rural District and Zangvan Rural District.

References 

Districts of Ilam Province
Sirvan County